Dany "Dany Boy" Kane
(19697 August 2000) was a Canadian criminal who was a compliant police informant at the same time. Kane worked for the Royal Canadian Mounted Police (RCMP) as an informant inside the Hells Angels for many years, and provided information to the police on the Hells Angels. Kane was found dead of an apparent suicide in the garage of his suburban Montreal home in the summer of 2000.

Early life
Born in L'Acadie, Quebec (now Saint-Jean-sur-Richelieu, Quebec). As a child Kane was brought up by caring relatives, attended private school and Boy Scouts and went on many expensive vacations. Kane's father, Jean-Paul Kane, was a bricklayer while mother, Gemma Brideau, was a housewife. Kane's family was poor, but respectable. To save money, Kane's parents spent him away to live with an uncle, which damaged Kane's self-esteem. Kane was a loner who disliked revealing his feelings and always felt out of place. Germain Godin, the owner of a local grocery store who employed Kane as a teenager recalled: "He was always very polite, a good employee. He was easy to deal with. It was a good family".

He grew up discontented with his life and wanted recognition in a bike gang in Quebec. Kane was a restless student who was incapable of sitting still in class.  When he was 16 he left school and took whatever work he could get. Robert Guimard, the neighbor of his parents introduced him to motorcycles and not long after he fell into the biker fraternity life of strip clubs run by the bikers in the small towns around Montreal.  Ever since the 1960s, there has been an outlaw biker subculture in Quebec, and Kane embraced it as a way of rejecting the values of his working-class family.

Criminal life
Kane's first crime was a break-and-enter when he was seventeen. By the age of eighteen, Kane joined a small biker gang based in St-Hubert  named the Condors led by Patrick Lambert. While working for the Condors he earned around $700 a week making sure dealers had the product they needed. The Condors merged with a Hells Angels puppet group known as the Evil Ones, but Kane resented having to prove himself again to a new set of bikers and decided to branch out and sell drugs, guns, and cigarettes on his own. From 1990 to 1992 he was making $3000 a week from drug trafficking and sold between thirty and fifty guns and accessories.

In September 1992, Kane and two other men nearly beat two men to death. During the beating he accidentally shot one of the men in the head.  Kane was convicted of conspiracy to murder, kidnapping, assault, illegal use of a firearm and possession of a gun with the serial number filed off.  He was given a 25-month sentence of which he only served ten months in prison and another five in a transition home.

Gang membership

Puppet Clubs
Kane was a member of the outlaw motorcycle groups known as the Condors, the Rockers, and the Demon Keepers, all of which were the puppet clubs of the Hells Angels. He had ties to Maurice Boucher, the biggest name in the Canadian Hells Angels. When his business began to suffer because he did not belong to a group, Kane approached two members of the Hells Angels, Walter Stadnick and David "Wolf" Carroll, with hope that they could get him into the Hells Angels.  After a year passed, with Kane doing what he thought was slave labour without being invited to the gang, he became annoyed with Stadnick and Carroll for not getting him into the gang. The Hells Angels is a hierarchical organization that requires recruits start in a puppet club.  If they do well, they graduate to the title of hang around, where they can't wear the patch but are considered an associate. Next, they become a prospect, where they get a half patch that shows the chapter's title. If they continue to perform well, they become a full patch member and get the Winged Death Head emblem. Kane had to work as a bodyguard and a chauffeur to Carroll and Stadnick; as a "mule" delivering drugs, prostitutes and guns; and paying for all their meals and drinks at restaurants and bars, in hope that he would be promoted up the ranks as a reward. Kane was considered to be a likeable and intelligent character whose only major weakness was sex as he bragged incessantly to anyone who would listen about the size of his penis and his sexual prowess with the opposite sex. Kane kept his bisexuality a closely guarded secret as homophobia is rampant within the outlaw biker subculture.

Demon Keepers
Kane was upset because he had worked with the gang for several years and was not even considered a hang around. Kane's luck then changed. Kane was "recruited by David (Wolf) Carroll and Walter (Nurgent) Stadnick to preside over three chapters of an Ontario puppet club called the Demon Keepers. The plan did not work out because Carroll was a serious alcoholic and never had money to support the gang which meant they could not intimidate drug dealers in cities such as Ottawa, Cornwall, and Toronto. Kane had the Demon Keepers ride through small towns like Belleville in attempts to pressure local drug dealers to buy from the Demon Keepers. Kane planned to take on the Outlaws, later writing in a confession to his police handlers: "While we were there, we put together several murder plots to eliminate the Outlaws. We slapped surveillance on them and the bars they frequented".  
 
Kane called the Demon Keepers a gang of "no-talent imbeciles" while Carroll was often too drunk to lend him support and Stadnick was attempting to persuade the Satan's Choice and Para-Dice Riders gangs to "patch over" to become Hells Angels. Kane came to suspect that the Demon Keepers were just a ploy by Stadnick to apply pressure on Satan's Choice and the Para-Dice Riders to "patch over" to the Hells Angels, making him feel rather used.

Arrest
On April 1, 1994, Kane was arrested in Belleville, Ontario for having two handguns in his car, and spent another four months in prison. Once Kane was arrested Stadnick shut down the Demon Keepers. After Kane was released from prison for his April 1994 weapons charges, he began to hate the Hells Angels. In July 1994, Kane started to associate with Scott Steinert, an American living in Montreal who was a "prospect" with the Hells Angels. Steinert planned to set up a Hells Angels chapter in Kingston once he was promoted up to a "full patch" Hells Angel and planned to have Kane move to Kingston with him. However, Carroll ordered Kane to rejoin the Evil Ones puppet gang, which Kane considered to be a major humiliation. Kane believed that the Hells Angels had used them and told one of his police handlers that he wanted revenge. Kane had become frustrated that he was still a member of the Rockers, the Hells Angels' puppet club in Montreal, and had not been promoted to become an Angel despite all of his work for the club.

Police Contact
On 17 October 1994, Kane contacted Staff-Sergeant Jean-Pierre Lévesque of the Royal Canadian Mounted Police to tell them he wanted to work as an informer. Kane's main contacts with the RCMP were Corporal Pierre Verdon and Sergeant Gaetan St. Onge. Kane had his first meeting with Verdon on 4 November 1994. By December 1994 he told Corporal Verdon about all of the above happenings as well as the Hells Angels business connections with top members of the Italian mafia as well as their plans to form an elite group of bikers called the Nomads. Kane told Verdon that Boucher said that the new Nomad chapter was going to be "plus rock n' roll", an untranslatable joual (Quebec French) phrase literally meaning "more rock n' roll", which roughly means something that is so "cool" that it is dangerous. Some of such business connections that Kane told the RCMP about was how the Hells Angels sent him twice to meet Moreno Gallo and Tony Mucci, members of the Italian mafia, to discuss drug trafficking. Kane's reports gave unprecedented insight to the RCMP about how the inner echelon of the Hells Angels worked.

Kane had a secretive, manipulative personality as he thoroughly enjoyed power and maneuvering behind-the-scenes to play off people. Throughout the Quebec biker war, Kane enjoyed the power as the only senior informer within the Hells Angels gave him over his RCMP handlers and his ability to halt the schemes of Hells Angels leaders such as Boucher by informing on them. Detective Benoît Roberge of the Service de police de la Ville de Montréal who worked as Kane's handler in 1999-2000 stated that Kane was shaped by growing up in small town L'Acadie instead of the working class urban criminal milieu that most Quebec Hells Angels came from. Roberge stated: "In that milieu, maybe Kane didn't have the criminal roots to say, 'Me, I'll never talk to the cops'. Because for many bikers, it's almost like a religion, it's so strong. What Kane did have was a James Bond side to him, a sense of adventure". Kane warned his RCMP handlers to be careful with sharing the intelligence collected by him with the Sûreté Due Québec, which he described as being systemically corrupt and with the police forces of Greenfield Park and Brossard. Kane reported that the Hells Angels had photographs of most of the Rock Machine members via police records.

Informant years
Kane's first stint as an informant lasted from 1994 to 1997 where he collected a total of $250,000.

The seizure of the mini-vans
On 19 December 1994, Kane took his police handlers on a guided tour of the hidden bomb factories for the Hells Angels located in various houses, apartments and offices throughout Montreal, Sorel and the South Shore. Due to Kane's information, which was passed on to the Montreal police, two weeks later the police seized two parked mini-vans that had been turned into drivable bombs that were each full of 50 sticks of dynamite. Both mini-vans were intended to kill Rock Machine members and St. Onge wrote: "This seizure saved lives".

Murder of Normand Baker
On 4 January 1995, Normand Baker, a member of the Rock Machine, was murdered in Acapulco, Mexico by a Hells Angel, François Hinse, who shot him in a bar. Kane informed the RCMP that Boucher had bribed the Acapulco police to have Hinse freed and on 15 January 1995 Hinse was freed. Verdon wrote: "Mexico has informed us of the liberation of Hinse despite all the evidence. It's a clear case of corruption...We understand that the HA [Hells Angels] invested a million Mexican pesos to buy the Mexican authorities. Events have proved C-2994 [Kane] right and once again demonstrated the reliability and importance of our source". In March 1995, Kane's cover was almost blown when Boucher was arrested for carrying a handgun, and an officer with the Sûreté de Québec told him that the RCMP had a "coded informer" whose number was C-2994 working within the ranks of the Angels.

Kane reported: "After some hard thinking, Mom [Boucher] reached the conclusion that it could be [one of] six people". Boucher concluded that the informer could only be Steinert; two Rockers; a Hells Angel supporter; or Kane. Kane stated that he felt "very nervous" because "he was the least known to Boucher and therefore...was the main suspect". Steinert told Boucher that his concerns were merely "babble", but Boucher was convinced there was an informer. Kane was temporarily saved when the Hells Angels hitman Serge Quesnel turned informer after his arrest in April 1995, which to the conclusion being reached in the Hells Angels that he was the "coded informer". However, Boucher dismissed this theory, noting that Quesnel was only a low-level hitman working for the Trois-Rivières chapter president Louis Roy, and that the informer would have had to be someone more high ranking than him. Boucher noted that the police had seized two mini-vans fitted out with dynamite, which led him to the conclusion that the police had been forewarned as he deduced that the police could not had discovered by accident two dynamite-packed mini-vans packed on the same day.

The Carroll-Steinert feud
At the same time, Kane was caught up between a power struggle between Carroll and Scott Steinert. Kane reported that Carroll and Steinert hated each other. Kane told his police handlers: "I like that-working for two guys. Working for two Hells, that allows me to skate between both of them". The journalists Julian Sher and William Marsden wrote Kane had placed himself in a dangerous position within the Carroll-Steinert feud as: "Riding the power plays within the Hells Angels is like trying to master the twisting schemes of ambitious-and sometimes psychotic-medieval princes. A wrong move could get you killed".

Kane described Steinert to his police handlers as the most aggressive and ruthless of the Angels and as Boucher's right-hand man as he made more money than any of the other Angels. Likewise, Kane described Carroll as a raging bully with an extremely bad temper and a propensity for violence. When Carroll asked Kane to drive him to Halifax in March 1995, Steinert refused to allow it and the two men almost came to blows over the issue. Shortly afterwards Kane was almost exposed as an informer when he mentioned that he had been present when one of Steinert's men, Richard Lock, together with a Mafiosi had beaten up the owner of the Crescent Bar in Montreal for refusing to pay protection money plus the 10% take on daily sales the Hells Angels and the Mafia expected from all bar and restaurant owners in Montreal. A Montreal police detective later accused Lock of beating up the owner of the Crescent Bar, which led Lock to believe it was Kane who was the informer.

In April 1995, Sergeant St. Onge was approached by a Montreal police detective who wanted to know who informer C2994 was, and was so persistent in demanding the identity of C2994 that St. Onge suspected he had been bribed by the Hells Angels, a suspicion later confirmed when the detective was arrested for taking bribes. As an informer, Kane-who was obsessed with sex-was noted for his odd behavior like calling St. Onge at about 2 am to say he just had sex with some stripper and then hand the phone over to have the stripper tell St. Onge about his sexual prowess.

Biker war
By April 1995 the Royal Canadian Mounted Police (RCMP) was paying Kane $2,000 a week. In August 1995, Kane reported it was Steinert who set off the bomb that killed 11-year old Daniel Desrochers. Kane reported: "Since that day, Steinert no longer talked about the bombs he had ordered and never again spoke about using bombs. Steinert asked some of his crew what they thought of the bombing...When told they thought the murderer should be liquidated, Steinert didn't respond and became very pensive". Sher and Marsden wrote Kane was sometimes self-serving in his reports to his RCMP handlers and he was well known expert at building bombs, suggesting there was a possibility that it was him instead of Steinert who set off the bomb that killed Desrochers. Kane was an expert bomb-maker and at least was a member of Steinert's bomb-making team instead of being the passive observer that he portrayed as.

On 20 February 1996, Kane reported that Carroll had met Donald Stockford in Saint-Sauveur to discuss a plan to ship drugs from Montreal to the Golden Horseshoe (i.e. greater Toronto area). Kane reported: "Their goal was to take a big part of the Toronto drug market". On 3 May 1996, Kane told his handlers that Stockford had arranged for a drug courier to go  Montreal to Toronto with one kilogram of cocaine; about 1, 000 ecstasy pills; and four kilograms of Hashish.  On 29 November 1996, Kane wrote in a report that Stockford had a courier deliver 300 kilograms of hashish to Hamilton, and in another report in January 1997 stated that he had sent another courier with 4 kilograms of cocaine to Oshawa.

Kane committed at least 11 murders from 1994 to 1997 during his time as the most highly placed RCMP informer in the Hells Angels. In September 1995, Kane was involved in the murder of a drug dealer, Stéphane Boire. On 3 March 1996, Kane killed Roland Labrasseur, a drug addict who had fallen behind in his debts to the Hells Angels by driving him out to the countryside south of Montreal, where he shot him in the head by a remote rural road. Kane had killed Labrasseur on Carroll's orders. Kane in his reports blamed the murder on a Hells Angels-linked drug dealer, Daniel Bouchard. Only in 2000 did Kane confess that he killed Labrasseur, and through admitted that he buried Boire's body, he continued to deny that he killed him. Kane in his reports stated that Labrasseur was a former soldier in the Canadian Army who an expert with explosives who had been building bombs for the Hells Angels. Kane was correct that Labrasseur had indeed served in the Canadian Army, but Verdon discovered from looking at his service records that he had no explosives training beyond learning how to throw a hand grenade. Sher and Marsden wrote that Labrasseur was "a sad character, a bit of a simpleton with a cocaine addiction" and that Kane's claims that he was an expert bomb-maker who built bombs set off by car alarms and pagers were fanciful at best. Kane appeared to be trying to blame Labrasseur for the bombings that he had himself had committed. Sher and Marsden wrote that Kane probably killed Boire despite the way that he continued to pin the blame on Bouchard, a man he clearly disliked.

Kane was active as a bomb-maker and he blew up the Green Stop restaurant in Châteauguay after the owner refused to pay protection money to the Hells Angels. On 9 November 1995 Kane told St. Onge that he was going to Thunder Bay to sell cocaine for Steinert to the local drug dealers as the price for cocaine in northern Ontario was $50,000/per kilo while in Montreal the price was $32,000/per kilo. Kane stated that Steinert was very keen to move into northern Ontario, which was so lucrative for selling cocaine. Kane reported that Carroll together with a member of the Rizzuto family owned a bar in the town of St. Sauveur, which by 1997 had been so successful that Carroll had started building condos in St. Sauveur as it was "a great chance to launder a bit of money". Kane had a wife and three children and was secretly a bisexual. His secret homosexual lover was Aimé Simard, who was murdered in 2003 in a Saskatchewan prison.

Magazine and Simard partnership
In July 1996, the RCMP gave Kane some $30,325 to set up a magazine Rencontres Selectes, a magazine catering to those looking for casual sex whose revenue came from ads for strippers, phone sex and prostitution. Kane launched a website to go along with his magazine, which catered to homosexuals looking for casual sex. Staff Sergeant St. Onge argued that it was necessary for the Mounties to subsidize Rencontres Selectes because it "it means he [Kane] didn't have to commit serious crimes and thus could avoid getting arrested himself arrested or killed and could continue to feed us information". Sher and Marsden wrote: "So, the Royal Canadian Mounted Police got into the sex magazine trade. Taxpayers' money financed Kane's weekly magazine. The force laundered its investment through a bank and a notary". In 1997, Rencontres Selectes collapsed owing to a lack of sales.

Kane reported in the summer of 1996 that a conflict was brewing within the Hells Angels Montreal chapter with one faction loyal to Steinert and another to Stadnick, Stockford and Carroll. Kane reported that Caroll hired André "Toots" Tousiganat in May 1996 to kill Donald "Bam Bam" Magnussen, the bodyguard to Steinert, and was very unhappy that after five months that Tousigant had failed to act. In October 1996, Kane was offered $10,000 by Carroll, Stockford and Stadnick to kill Magnussen. Kane knew that Steinert would have him killed if he killed Magnussen, and to get out of the dilemma, asked his handlers to warn Magnussen his life was in danger. Roberge warned Magunssen that his life was in danger, but dismissed the warning as a police plot. Kane was saved when Boucher declared that since Magnussen was a full patch Hells Angel, only another full patch Angel could kill him, and not a Rocker like Kane. Kane reported that Boucher had declared as a Nomad president that Stadnick had to kill Magunssen. In February 1997, Magunssen beat up Leonardo Rizzuto, the son of the Mafia boss Vito Rizzuto outside of a bar on St. Laurent Boulevard. Kane reported that Vito Rizzuto was furious with Magunssen and wanted him dead.

In November 1996, Kane used his own website to meet Aimé Simard whom he recruited into the Rockers. On their first date, the two men went to Simard's mother's house, where they had sex in the whirlpool. Both men lied to each other with Simard saying he had gone to prison for trying to kill a police officer (Simard had served a prison sentence for uttering death threats) while Kane claimed to be Hells Angel (Kane was only a Rocker). Unlike the control freak Kane, Simard was reckless and out of control. As Simard was junior to him in the Rockers, he had to serve as Kane's virtual slave, chauffeuring him around Montreal, through Simard was a poor driver who twice smashed up Kane's cars. The journalists Julian Sher and William Marsden wrote that Kane "seemed to view Simard as a goofy sort of toy-somebody he could play with or employ as the need arose". In February 1997, Kane and Simard were dispatched by Carroll to kill a drug dealer in Halifax named Robert MacFarlane. Carroll had been the president of the Angels' Halifax chapter from 1984 to 1990, and after moving to Montreal, he remained closely involved in the operations of the Halifax chapter, regularly going back to his hometown to inspect operations.

Along the way to Halifax, Kane and Simard were pulled over in Oromocto, New Brunswick by the RCMP under the suspicion of smuggling drugs as the two men were dressed in such a flamboyant way that the two officers, Constables Gilles Blinn and Dale Hutley, thought they must be drug dealers. Kane and Simard co-operated with the two officers, but refused to allow them to open the trunk of their car, and lacking both probable cause and a warrant, the two officers did not search the car's trunk with the guns in it. The search caused a "silent hit" on the RCMP's computers as anytime a police officer contacts an informer it causes an alarm on the central computer system of the RCMP. However, the RCMP did not become overtly concerned about what Kane was doing in New Brunswick despite the fact that Kane had not mentioned to his handlers that he was going to Halifax. On 27 February 1997, Kane and Simard killed MacFarlane in an industrial park in Halifax. MacFarlane had discovered his car was being followed by Kane and Simard and parked his car in the industrial park. MacFarlane got out to confront them while Simard shot him with a .38 handgun from the passenger's window As MacFarlane screamed in pain from his wound, he ran away while Simard and Kane both got of the car to give chase and finally gunned him down.

St. Onge and Verdon had a new superior in the form of Staff Sergeant Pierre "Patame" Bolduc. Bolduc felt that much of Kane's information was useless as far as prosecuting Hells Angels was concerned and that the Mounties were paying exorbitant amounts of money for nothing. Bolduc complained that the RCMP had paid C-2294 $2,000 dollars per week plus $32,000 invested in his magazine and a $10,000 debt they had paid for him. On 28 March 1997, Simard killed a member of the Rock Machine, Jean-Marc Caissy, in Montreal and was arrested for the crime on 11 April 1997. Simard agreed to become a délateur (informer) after his arrest, and in his confession mentioned that he and Kane had killed MacFarlane. Simard also confessed that he had been Kane's lover, which came as a revelation to Kane's handlers who never suspected their relationship.

Trial
With pressure in Montreal from the newly formed federal-provincial Wolverine bike squad and the recent arrest of his partner, Simard, on an unrelated murder charge, Kane would be brought into custody by the Nova Scotia RCMP for 18 months but would then be released due to the RCMP's contradictory evidence.

Police threats
Two RCMP officers from Halifax, Sergeant G.A. Barnett and Constable Tom Townsend arrived in Montreal to ask that Kane be extradited to Halifax to face charges of first degree murder for the killing of MacFarane, and first learned that Kane was the RCMP's main informer within the Hells Angels. The RCMP went out of its way to protect Kane as an internal memo noted "the disclosure...has the potential to cause significant negative media attention". The RCMP was especially keen to protect Kane because Gilles Mathieu of the Nomad chapter had declared his willingness to sponsor Kane as a "hang-around" with the Nomad chapter, which is what Kane's handlers had long wanted.

In order to keep him from being questioned by the Wolverine squad, the RCMP arrested Kane on 30 April 1997 and sent him to Halifax. In Halifax, Constable Townsend tried to force him to confess to MacFarlane's murder by threatening to reveal he had been an informer, and to forestall that threat, Kane informed Carroll that Townsend was accusing him of being an informer, portraying it as an attempt by the Crown to force him to confess by falsely tagging him as an informer. St. Onge stated: "He was very smart. He knew Carroll had been accused of murder in Halifax and that the police had tried a similar ploy with him. And so he also knew that Carroll would understand and pass the word to the others that Kane was not talking".

French Trial
The French-Canadian Kane insisted on his constitutional right to have his trial in French, which delayed the proceedings as the Crown had to find a French-speaking judge, jury and Crown Attorney for his trial in Halifax. Kane's trial which began on 13 October 1998 was a farce as the judge Félix Cacchione ruled the pull-over in Oromocto was not warranted and ruled the evidence from it as inadmissible such as the computer search done by Blinn, through he did ruled that Blinn could testify that he identified Kane in a police line-up as the man he had pulled over in Oromocto. Simard was the main witness for the Crown, but to confirm his story required that Blinn and Hutley confirm that Kane was the man they had pulled over with Simard. During the trial, various police officers gave conflicting testimony about whatever Blinn and Hutley had picked Kane out of a police line-up on 6 May 1997 or not.

During his time in custody for a murder that he would be acquitted for, the RCMP would drop Kane as an informant. On 18 December 1998, Judge Cachione who become notably annoyed with the confusing and contradictory statements from various policemen about whether Blinn and Hutley had picked Kane out of a line-up or not, threw the entire case out, saying the Crown's conduct had been so "egregious" that it would violate Kane's rights under the Charter of Rights and Freedoms to have the trial continue. Some of the detectives with the Montreal police believed that the RCMP deliberately sabotaged the trial to protect Kane.

Agent source
On 8 August 1999, Detective Benoît Roberge of the Service de police de la Ville de Montréal approached Kane about working as an agent source informer (i.e. an informer with signed contract committing the Crown to pay a certain sum of money in exchange for testifying in court). On August 23, 1999, a Montreal Urban Community Police Detective named Benoit Roberge talked with Kane. In a few months time after that date, Kane would be under contract with the Surete du Quebec as an agent source, and not just an informant. This meant he had to detail everything he did with the Hells Angels, communicate with Roberge a few times a week, and testify about the things he did with the Hells Angels.

In a 30-page contract Kane made with the police, he would have made upwards of $2 million and the total cost of his operation, including witness relocation and overtime and operating expenses for police handlers would have been over $8.6 million. Kane "kept them informed about what the top bikers in his circle were up to: where they were travelling; whom they were talking to; who had murdered whom and who was next; the Hells’ war plans against their Quebec rivals, the Rock Machine; their expansion plans into Ontario and Manitoba; and weapons and explosives purchases." Kane reported that the la messe ("the mass") as mandatory meetings for the Rockers were known were always presided over by a Nomad and every Rocker had to provide 10% of his earnings from crime to the Hells Angels. Kane stated that la messe were held at motels, and the members only learned of them the day before when a Rocker would hand out business cards with the name of the motel and the room that they were to meet.

Mersereau Murders
In the fall of 1999, Kane again become involved with murder plots initiated by Carroll.

Randy
A former Hells Angel in Halifax named Randy Mersereau had broken away to form his own gang, and was reported to have put out contracts on the lives of Carroll, Boucher and Mike McCrea, the president of the Angels' Halifax chapter as a prelude to joining the Bandidos. On 22 September 1999, Kane mentioned to Roberge that he was going to Halifax to kill Mersereau for Carroll, saying "He told me to get a gun. We're going there [Halifax], I don't known when we're coming back, but bring a gun". On 23 September 1999, the Angels bombed the car ownership owned by Mersereau in Truro, injuring 7 people including Mersereau. Kane's assassin assignment presented a challenge for his handlers since if he was allowed to kill Mersereau, that would make them accessories to murder, or if he did not, then the Angels might suspect he was working for the police.

To solve the problem, it was agreed that Kane would drive Carroll to Halifax, but on 24 September, as prearranged, the Sûreté du Québec pulled over Kane outside of Rivière-du-Loup for speeding. The patrolmen found in Kane's car a .38 handgun belonging to Kane and a machine gun belonging to Carroll. Both men were charged with violating gun control laws. However, Randy Mersereau was last seen alive on 31 October 1999 and his car was found abandoned on the highway between Halifax and Truro. On 3 November 1999, Kane told Roberge that Carroll had sent a new team of assassins from Montreal to Halifax, who seized Mersereau from his car on the evening of Halloween, killed him with a 9 mm machine gun and buried him in a forest in the interior of Nova Scotia. Mersereau's skeleton was not discovered until December 2010.

In January 2000, Roberge reported that Kane was suffering from depression, stating: "The source is going through a phrase where he is not motivated and is rethinking his personal life". Kane had to work 18-hour days, meeting with his handlers at 7 am, and spent most of his days working as a chauffeur and bodyguard to the Nomad Normand Robitalle. In February 2000, Kane was temporarily suspended from the Rockers after he was $3, 000 in arrars relating to unpaid membership dues. That same month, Kane was forced to take on a $130, 000 drug debt run up by the Nomad Denis Houle. In February 2000, Kane unleashed a tirade on Carroll recorded by the wire he was wearing as spoke with much anger: "It's been ten years, ten years that I've been around the Hells Angels. Fuck, that's a long time. But it changes nothing, it counts for nothing. Wolf, nothing you do counts". On 10 March 2000, Kane signed a confession listing all of his various crimes as part of his agent source contract.  In his confession, Kane finally admitted that he killed MacFarlane in 1997, writing that a Halifax businessman named Paul Wilson had hired the Hells Angels to kill MacFarlane and that n turn the contract was passed on to him and Simard.

Kirk
After his murder, the leadership of the Mersereau gang passed on to his younger brother, Kirk Mersereau, who vowed to avenge his brother. On 31 March 2000, Kane told Roberge that Carroll was planning to kill Kirk Mersereau in the near-future. On 25 June 2000, Kane was ordered by Caroll to go to Halifax at once, and the next day he met Carroll in a McDonald's in Truro. On 7:14 pm on 26 June, Kane phoned Roberge to say: "Carroll wants to kill Randy's brother". Later that evening, Kane went to the Angels' Halifax clubhouse to meet Carroll and McCrea who agreed that Jeff Lynds, a follower in the Mersereau gang would kill his leader in exchange for being made a prospect with the Hells Angels and Kane would help him. Kane's handlers were desperately thinking of way to stop the murder plot without compromising Kane's cover, but on 30 June 2000, Mersereau was injured in a car accident, which led to the plot being cancelled.  On 10 September 2000, Kirk Mersereau and his wife Nancy were murdered execution-style in their farmhouse outside of Halifax. The Nova Scotia RCMP had have expressed much anger that neither the Sûreté du Québec or the Service de police de la Ville de Montréal ever shared Kane's information about the plots against the Mersereau brothers with them as Kane's information was only made public in 2003 during a trial in Montreal.

Death
Kane's information led the police in the year 2000 to a man the Angel records called "Boueuf", who turned out to be Gerald Matticks, the boss of the West End Gang. Kane revealed that Elias Luis Lekkas of the West End Gang was making regular trips between the Nomad "bank" on Beaubien Street to Mattick's estate, carrying bags full of $500,000 dollars in cash.

In the summer of 2000, Kane was described as being highly depressed as he noted he was still working as a chauffeur for the Hells Angels, spending his days driving around the Nomad Normand Robitaille around Montreal while other Angels had no trouble assigning him their debts. One Hells Angel Denis Houle told Kane that he now had to pay off the $80,000 drug debt that he had run up with the Sherbrooke chapter of the Angels. At the same time, Kane's patron Carroll had run up a $400,000 drug debt which was forgiven, which emphasized Kane's lack of importance.

Kane was invited to a fellow biker's wedding in the summer of 2000, and to help protect his cover police gave him $1,000 to bring as a wedding gift. A few days after the wedding, Kane's body was found in his suburban Montreal home with a confusing suicide note that mentioned his sexuality and conflict involved with being a biker and an informant. Kane's suicide note stated: "Who am I? Am I a biker? Am I a policeman? Am I good or evil? Am I heterosexual or gay? Am I loved or feared? Am I exploited or the exploiter?" Commander André Bouchard of the Montreal police stated in an interview: "A lot of people say that we killed him, and a lot of people say that he was killed by the Hells Angels, and a lot of people say he's not dead. But I can tell you that he's dead, because my friend was his controller and was the one who identified him in his car. Dany was the best source we had. He'd call [the police] before he had a meeting with Mom [Boucher], and we'd put cameras in...that's how we got them. Dany even gave us Matticks on Beaubien Street where we got Matticks coming in there with fucking hockey bags full of money". Bouchard suggested that Kane killed himself because he knew that ultimately he would have to testify against the Hells Angel leaders, which would expose him as an informer.

Notes

References

1969 births
2000 deaths
Canadian male criminals
Police informants
Bisexual men
Criminals from Quebec
Organized crime in Montreal
People from Saint-Jean-sur-Richelieu
Canadian bisexual people
Hells Angels
20th-century Canadian criminals
20th-century Canadian LGBT people
Date of birth missing